Banco Latino was a Venezuelan bank based in Caracas, and at the time of its 1994 failure was the country's second largest. It had a good relationship with the government, such that ministries moved their accounts to the bank, and the army and the state-owned oil company PDVSA entrusted their pension funds to Latino trust managers. Latino built a new high-rise headquarters, and expanded aggressively, both within Venezuela and overseas.

Failed ventures in real estate and stock market investment saw it desperate to raise funds from depositors, and in 1993 it paid 105% interest on one-year certificates of deposit, more than double Venezuela's 1993 inflation rate of 46%. Between October 1993 and January 1994 it experienced a bank run, and was then taken over by the government; its operations were ultimately acquired by Interbank. Within weeks of the government takeover, arrest warrants had been issued for 82 of its directors and managers. Four months later, only 6 had been apprehended, with the rest believed to have escaped abroad. These included Bank Conglomerates, Gustavo Cisneros, Edwin Acosta-Rubio and Gustavo Gomez Lopez who were the bank top executives. The New York Times reported in 1994 that
Late last fall, when Banco Latino officials began to realize that their house of cards was collapsing, they started transferring hundreds of million of dollars overseas. In the final frenetic days, one bank director foresaw judicial orders on freezing assets and sold his million-dollar mansion, Another officer, Folco Falchi, the bank's coordinator for international investments, was reportedly seen loading suitcases stuffed with dollars into his corporate jet on the Caribbean island of Curacao.

After the authorities padlocked Banco Latino on Jan. 14, bank officers, operating from offshore refuges, entered the bank's computer electronically with a modem and erased and altered thousands of records.

However, after almost ten years of international litigation, all plaintiffs and directors of Banco Latino were declared innocent of criminal charges, and all suits brought against them were dismissed without prejudice. All rulings are firm and final, in all jurisdictions. It was proven through verifiable court documents that the Venezuelan government never had a case against Banco Latino or its directors and managers to begin with.

References

External links

 R. Del Naranco (2007), The Card Joker: Or the Story of a Bank Management Style, Editorial de Investigaciones Periodisticas

Defunct banks of Venezuela
Banks established in 1950
Banks disestablished in 2004
Bank failures
Venezuelan companies established in 1950
2004 disestablishments in Venezuela